The 2003 Dayao earthquake occurred on July 21, at 23:16:33 CST. The epicenter of the moment magnitude 5.9 earthquake was in Dayao County in the mountainous area of central Yunnan, China. At least 19 people were killed, 644 were injured, and 8,406 families became homeless. The quake also caused $75 million USD in damages.

Tectonic setting
Yunnan is located at the southeastern edge of the Tibetan Plateau, where the Indian Plate is colliding north–northeast into the Eurasian Plate (Asia). The continental deformation is accommodated by major faults in the area, mostly of strike-slip movement. The Indian Plate pushes into Asia, uplifting the Tibetan Plateau and causes it rotate clockwise, along the Xianshuihe fault system. This deformation spreads into Yunnan, where active strike-slip faulting occur.

Earthquake
The earthquake measured 6.1 on the surface-wave magnitude scale. It was the first of two earthquakes in the same area that year. In October, an  6.2 ( 5.6) earthquake struck nearby, killing three people. The July earthquake occurred as a result of shallow strike-slip faulting. Coulomb stress transfer from the July quake increased the chance of failure on nearby faults which triggered the October quake.

Impact
The quake occurred when most victims were asleep. In the village of Ganghe, at least 11 people were killed due to collapsing homes made of mud. An aftershock on July 23 caused additional collapses and injured 51 people. In Songziyuan village, many homes were destroyed. Large fissures opened in roads and landslides blocked passing vehicles. At least one person died in the village. A total of 264,474 houses collapsed, leaving many homeless.

See also
 List of earthquakes in 2003
 List of earthquakes in China
 List of earthquakes in Yunnan

References

External links

2003 earthquakes
Earthquakes in Yunnan
Geography of Chuxiong Yi Autonomous Prefecture
2003 disasters in China
2003 in China